Chile competed in the 2015 Pan American Games in Toronto, Ontario, Canada, from July 10 to 26, 2015.

Track and field athlete Isidora Jiménez won a public vote, and thus was named the flagbearer of the country at the opening ceremony.

Competitors
The following table lists Chile's delegation per sport and gender.

Medalists

The following competitors from Chile won medals at the games. In the by discipline sections below, medalists' names are bolded.

|style="text-align:left; width:78%; vertical-align:top;"|

|style="text-align:left; width:22%; vertical-align:top;"|

Archery

Chile qualified three male and two female archers based on its performance at the 2014 Pan American Championships. Later Chile qualified 1 more women based on its performance at the 2015 Copa Merengue.

Men

Women

Athletics

Men
Track and road events

Field events

Women
Track and road events

Field events

Badminton

Chile has qualified a team of four athletes (two men and two women).

Men

Women

Mixed

Beach volleyball

Chile has qualified a men's and women's pair for a total of four athletes.

Men

Women

Bowling

Boxing

Chile qualified two male boxers
Men

Canoeing

Slalom
Chile has qualified the following boats:

Sprint
Chile has qualified 8 athletes in the sprint discipline (4 in men's kayak and 1 in women's kayak, 2 in men's canoe and 1 in women's canoe).

Men

Women

Qualification Legend: QF = Qualify to final; QS = Qualify to semifinal

Cycling

BMX

Mountain
Chile qualified three mountain bikers.
Mountain biking

Road
Men

Women

Track
Team Pursuit

Omnium

Diving

Chile qualified four divers (two men and two women).

Equestrian

Fencing

Field hockey

Chile has qualified both a men's and women's teams for a total of 32 athletes (16 men and 16 women).

Men's tournament

Pool B

Quarterfinal

Semifinal

Bronze medal match

Women's tournament

Pool B

Quarterfinal

Semifinal

Bronze medal match

Golf

Gymnastics

Artistic
Chile qualified 8 athletes.

Men
Team & Individual Qualification

Qualification Legend: Q = Qualified to apparatus final

Women

Qualification Legend: Q = Qualified to apparatus final

Rhythmic
Chile has qualified one athlete.

Individual

Qualification Legend: Q = Qualified to apparatus final

Handball

Chile has qualified a men's and women's teams. Each team will consist of 15 athletes, for a total of 30.

Men's tournament

Group B

Semifinals

Bronze medal match

Women's tournament

Group B

Classification round

Seventh place match

Judo

Chile has qualified a team of four judokas (two men and two women).

Men

Women

Karate

Chile qualified 8 athletes.

Men

Women

Modern pentathlon

Chile qualified a team of 4 athletes (2 men and 2 women).

Men

Women

Racquetball

Chile qualified a team of two women.

Singles and doubles 

Team

Roller sports

Chile qualified a full team of six athletes (three men and three women).

Figure
Chile qualified one skater in each event.

Speed
Chile qualified two men and two women.

Rowing

Chile qualified 9 boats.

Men

Women

Qualification Legend: FA=Final A (medal); FB=Final B (non-medal); R=Repechage

Rugby sevens

Chile has qualified a men's team for a total of 12 athletes.

Men's tournament

Group A

Sailing

Chile qualified seven boats and 14 sailors.

Men

Women

Open

Shooting

Chile qualified ten shooters.

Men

Women

Qualification Legend: QG=Gold medal match; QB=Bronze medal match

Squash

Swimming

Synchronized swimming

Chile has qualified a duet team of two athletes.

Table tennis

Chile has qualified a full team of 3 male and 3 female athletes

Men
Individual

Team

Women
Individual

Team

Taekwondo

Chile has qualified a team of 5 athletes (3 men´s and 2 women´s).

Men

Women

Tennis

Chile nominated 5 tennis players (2 men and 3 women) to compete in the tournament.

Men

Women

Mixed

Triathlon

Water Skiing

Chile qualified four water skiers (two men and two women).

Waterski

Overall

Weightlifting

Chile has qualified a team of 4 athletes (2 men and 2 women).

Wrestling

Chile qualified three male wrestlers.
Men
Freestyle

Greco-Roman

See also
Chile at the 2016 Summer Olympics

References

Nations at the 2015 Pan American Games
2015
2015 in Chilean sport